Vezzano sul Crostolo is a comune (municipality) in the Province of Reggio Emilia in the Italian region Emilia-Romagna, located about  west of Bologna and about  southwest of Reggio Emilia.   

Vezzano sul Crostolo borders the following municipalities: Albinea, Casina, Canossa, Quattro Castella, San Polo d'Enza, Viano.

References

External links
 Official website

Cities and towns in Emilia-Romagna